Sergei Sergeyevich Grishin (born 18 November 1973) is a Russian professional football coach and a former player. He is an assistant coach with the Under-21 squad of FC Torpedo Moscow.

Honours
 Russian Premier League runner-up: 1997.
 Russian Cup runner-up: 1997, 1999.
 Kazakhstan Cup winner: 2005.
 Top 33 players year-end list: 1997.

International career
Grishin played his first game for Russia on 30 April 1997 against Luxembourg in a 1998 FIFA World Cup qualifier, scoring a goal on his debut. He only played two more games for Russia.

Career stats

Personal life
His father Sergei Grishin also played football professionally, winning the title in the Soviet Top League in 1976.

In September 2022, Grishin received summons to appear at the military commissariat for potential call-up to the Russian Army during the 2022 Russian mobilization.

References

  Profile

1973 births
Footballers from Moscow
Living people
Russian footballers
Russia international footballers
Association football midfielders
FC Asmaral Moscow players
FC Dynamo Moscow players
FC Shinnik Yaroslavl players
FC Anzhi Makhachkala players
FC Akhmat Grozny players
FC Zhenis Astana players
FC Torpedo Moscow players
FC Torpedo-2 players
Russian Premier League players
Kazakhstan Premier League players
Russian expatriate footballers
Expatriate footballers in Kazakhstan
Russian expatriate sportspeople in Kazakhstan
Russian football managers